Lafayette Federal Credit Union (Lafayette Federal), is a credit union headquartered at the Norman Cohen Financial Service Center in Rockville, Maryland, chartered and regulated under the authority of the National Credit Union Administration (NCUA) of the U.S. Federal government. As of January 2023, Lafayette Federal had over US$1.79 billion in assets, and over 56,700 members.

History
On October 3, 1935, 1825 H Street Federal Credit Union was established and officially opened its doors in the heart of Washington, DC. The credit union was created to serve the employees of the Reconstruction Finance Corporation, the RFC Mortgage Company and the Commodity Credit Corporation. For the first few years, personal loans up to $50 (or $1,000 at today’s value) were the sole product offering. By 1939, the maximum limit on the loans was increased to $100 (or $2,000 at today’s value), and vehicle loans were also added as a second loan type.

In 1940, the credit union moved across town in Washington, DC, from its original H Street location to the Lafayette Building on Vermont Avenue in Northwest, and officially changed its name to Lafayette Federal Credit Union. During the 1940s, Lafayette Federal expanded its products and services to include share accounts and U.S. Savings Bonds. Staffing increased to six employees (five full-time and one part-time).

By the early 1950s, Lafayette Federal had reached 960 members, $129,000 in total loans outstanding, and assets of nearly $500,000. Additionally, the Small Business Administration was added to the field of membership.

Lafayette Federal experienced further growth during the 1960-70s time period. The credit union moved its headquarter location to the U.S. Department of State Building and added the U.S. Peace Corps as yet another organization within its field of membership. By 1970, the National Credit Union Administration was formed as the official entity to supervise and regulate credit unions. As a result of this, the “once a member, always a member” policy is adopted. By 1974, Lafayette Federal reached $10 million in assets and had 7,600 members.

The 1980s led to the launch of several new products and services to the credit union. Share draft, certificate, and IRA accounts, as well as first trust mortgage and home equity loans, were rolled out to the membership. Additionally, Lafayette Federal began offering ATM cards, paving the way for increased accessibility. In 1989, the credit union moved its headquarter location to a larger location in Kensington, Maryland.

In 1992, Lafayette Federal completed its first merger with Potomac Community Federal Credit Union. Following this, the credit union made major technological strides with the rollout of several new electronic services, including: telephone bill pay system, 24-hour telephone loan application service, access debit card, online banking system and the inaugural website. Lafayette Federal was one of the first financial institutions in the market to offer online banking services to its membership.

During the early 2000s brought about the start of several new partnerships. Lafayette Federal teamed up with other credit unions to form Potomac Business Services, LLC in order to provide commercial loans to growing businesses. A couple of years later, commercial accounts and relationship checking accounts are introduced, offering more deposit options for both consumers and businesses. In 2008, Lafayette Federal hosts its very first Capitol Classic Charity Golf Tournament, thus commencing an annual charity event for the credit union. 

In 2010, the credit union celebrated its 75 year anniversary. Over the next two years, membership eligibility is once again expanded with through the addition of the American Consumer Council (ACC). Through this organization, all residents of Washington, DC, Maryland, and Virginia are eligible to join. In 2016, Lafayette Federal completed its second merger with CSC Employees Federal Credit Union (still operating as Lafayette Federal Credit Union). The following year, the credit union moved its headquarters to Rockville, MD, and opened a branch on the premises a year later.
 
As a result of the COVID-19 pandemic, 2020 was a landmark year worldwide. Lafayette Federal was able to shift gears to accommodate the new landscape. During this time, Lafayette Federal was able to maintain operations and continued to experience membership and loan growth. Following the credit union philosophy of “people helping people”, the credit union launched several initiatives aimed at aiding those at the frontline of the pandemic. With its Fuel the Frontline initiative, Lafayette Federal donated 1,755 meals to first responders and $850 in gift cards to Fox 5 DC's Hometown Heroes during the pandemic. Their performance was recognized by S&P Global by ranking #20 in their Top 100 Performing Credit Unions of 2020 Report. One year later, the credit union once again received national recognition as one of Newsweek’s America’s Best Banks for 2022. By March 31, 2021, Lafayette Federal reached a milestone $1 billion in assets. Later that year, the credit union raised an impressive $65,000 for Children's Miracle Network Hospitals, totaling $1 million in charitable donations over the lifetime of the organization's fundraising efforts.

Membership
Lafayette Federal's field of membership is set by the National Credit Union Administration (NCUA). As with all credit unions, membership at Lafayette Federal is limited to individuals sharing the common bond defined within its credit union charter. All residents of Washington, D.C., Maryland and Virginia are added to Lafayette Federal's field of membership through the American Consumer Council (ACC).

Once a Member‚ Always a Member policy

Lafayette Federal Credit Union operates under a "once a member, always a member" policy. Regardless of the way members originally obtain eligibility, once they become a member they are able to retain their membership in the credit union as long as a minimum balance of $50 is held in a Share Savings account.

Residents of Potomac, MD

Persons who live or work in that part of Montgomery County, Maryland, known as Potomac, bounded on the south by the Potomac River from Riley's Lock Road on the west to Cabin John Parkway on the east, on the east by Cabin John Parkway to the Capital Beltway 495 to Interstate 270, on the north by Shady Grove Road to State Route 28 to State Route 112, and on the west by State Route 112 and Seneca Road to River Road to Riley's Lock Road to the Potomac River are eligible. However, the military reservation known as the U. S. Navy Ship Research and Development Center is excluded from this field of membership.

Select Washington, D.C. residents

Many individuals who live, work, worship or attend school in Washington, D.C. are eligible to become members. However, the D.C. charter only extends to individuals within certain geographic boundaries.

Select employee groups

Membership is extended to all direct-hire individuals employed by or retired from the authorized list of employers throughout the United States. Lafayette Federal Credit Union's official website provides a complete list of these selected organizations.

Eligibility through a family member

Eligibility is extended to immediate family of current Lafayette Federal members. This includes: grandparents, parents, spouses, children (including foster and adopted), grandchildren and siblings. Un-remarried spouses of persons who died while employed by any of our eligible organizations are also eligible for membership.

Eligibility through the Home Ownership Financial Literacy Council

Eligibility is extended to all members of the Home Ownership Financial Literacy Council. With a one-time fee membership fee of just $10, applicants gain access to comprehensive home ownership and financial educational tools, as well as eligibility to become a member of Lafayette Federal.

Services
Lafayette Federal Credit Union offers an array of services, including:

Management team
Mr. B. John Farmakides is the president/CEO of Lafayette Federal Credit Union. Mr. Farmakides has been an active member of the Lafayette Federal community since 1994. He joined the supervisory committee in 1998, and later served as its chairman. In 2006, he was elected to the board of directors and was subsequently nominated to and assumed the position of treasurer. Mr. Farmakides was named president and CEO in 2007. Prior to that, he worked in investment banking, commercial real estate, and the Federal government.

Currently, Mr. Farmakides holds positions on many professional boards and committees including: vice-chairman of Potomac Business Services LLC, director of the board for Preferred Business Xchange, LLC, and serves on the Regulatory Committee of the National Association of Federal Credit Unions.

Mr. Farmakides, a licensed attorney, received his B.B.A and M.B.A. degrees from James Madison University, and a J.D. law degree from the American University.

Mr. Farmakides is assisted by the senior management team at Lafayette Federal Credit Union, which is composed of:
 Stephen Harrell, Chief Financial Officer
 Lynn English, Senior Vice President, Risk Management
 Jeff Ference, Senior Vice President, Operations
 Gladys Magsino, Senior Vice President, Administration
 Tina Werking‚ Senior Vice President, Lending
 Andrew Mason‚ Senior Vice President, Information Technology
 Roland Varblow‚ Senior Vice President, Mortgage Lending

Lafayette Federal is governed by a board of volunteers, elected by and from its membership.

Mission Statement
We serve, support and empower our members by understanding their financial needs, delivering products and services to achieve their financial goals and offering solutions to assure their financial well-being.

Vision Statement
Your credit union for life.

Community involvement
Lafayette Federal has provided $1 million in charitable donations over the lifetime of the organization's fundraising efforts, including over $877,000 to Children’s Miracle Network Hospitals and $92,000 to the Capital Area Food Bank. Additionally, the organization has provided financial assistance to members during natural disasters, including Hurricane Katrina and the California wildfires, $375 million in consumer and mortgage loans to low-income communities since 2002 with 451% Loan Growth (YOY), and has served 1,755 meals to local frontline heroes in the medical and emergency response field during the COVID-19 pandemic and provided $850 in gift cards through Fox 5 DC’s Hometown Hero on-air segment.

ATM locations
Members can access their accounts through an extensive network of surcharge-free ATMs and shared branches available nationwide, through Lafayette's partnership with the Co-Op Network.

References

External links
 Official website

Credit unions based in Maryland
Credit unions based in Washington, D.C.
Banks established in 1935
Companies based in Rockville, Maryland
1935 establishments in Maryland